Devon Diggle (born 15 June 1988 in Montreal, Quebec) is a male former water polo player from Canada. He joined the senior Canadian national team in 2007. He was part of the Canadian team at the 2008 Summer Olympics. He also competed at the 2013 World Aquatics Championships in Barcelona, Spain, where they finished in 11th place. He played for Dollard-des-Ormeaux. He trained at the Talisman Centre in Calgary.

He studied at the University of Calgary.

Results
2010
 5th place at Syracusa Invitational in Sicily, Italy

2009
8th place at World Championships in Rome

2008
11th place in the Beijing Olympic Games
4th place at the Olympic Qualifications in Romania

2007
13th place at the Junior World Championships in Los Angeles.
2nd leading scorer in the tournament

World Championship appearances
2009 – 8th
2013 – 11th

National titles
2004 U15
2005 U18, U22
2006 U22
2008 U22, senior
2009 Senior
2010 Senior

Awards
3 times national championship Most Valuable Player
7 times All-Star
2 time Montreal Amateur Athlete of the Week.

See also
 Canada at the 2013 World Aquatics Championships

References

External links
 profile at Olympic.ca

Canadian male water polo players
Living people
Anglophone Quebec people
Water polo players from Montreal
1988 births
Water polo players at the 2008 Summer Olympics
Water polo players at the 2011 Pan American Games
Olympic water polo players of Canada
Pan American Games medalists in water polo
Pan American Games silver medalists for Canada
Medalists at the 2011 Pan American Games